John Corona (born November 25, 1988) is an American former competitive ice dancer who competed with Pilar Bosley.

Career 
Bosley and Corona won the novice pewter medal at the 2005 U.S. Championships and competed for two seasons on the ISU Junior Grand Prix series, winning one medal. They announced the end of their partnership on April 8, 2008.

Personal life
Corona graduated from West Chester East High School in 2007. He began attending Ursinus College in January, 2008. and graduated in 2012. Corona worked at Belltower Books, LLC. and then became a certified personal trainer.

Programs
(with Bosley)

Competitive highlights
(with Bosley)

References

External links

 Official site
 
 

American male ice dancers
1988 births
Living people
Sportspeople from Philadelphia